Corethrovalva paraplesia is a moth of the family Gracillariidae. It is known from South Africa.

The larvae feed on Rhus species. They probably mine the leaves of their host plant.

References

Endemic moths of South Africa
Acrocercopinae
Moths of Africa
Moths described in 1961